Stephen McBride (born 6 April 1983) is a retired footballer from Northern Ireland. McBride was named in the 2008 Irish League Select XI.

'Steeky', as he is known by the fans, began his career as an amateur at Civil Service, before being snapped up by then manager Alan Dornan in the summer of 2002. Since then, was the first choice left-back for many years at Crusaders, making his 300th appearance in a 2–1 victory over Glentoran.

McBride has won many honours with the Crues, and was part of the side that became All-Ireland champions by winning the 2012 Setanta Sports Cup, although he was sent off at the end of normal time.

McBride signed for Ballymena United in the summer of 2013.

Honours
Crusaders
Irish Cup (1): 2008–09
Setanta Sports Cup (1): 2012
Irish League Cup (1): 2011–12
County Antrim Shield (1): 2009–10
Irish First Division (1): 2005–06
IFA Intermediate League Cup (1): 2005–06
Steel & Sons Cup (1): 2005–06

References 

Association footballers from Northern Ireland
Ballymena United F.C. players
Crusaders F.C. players
Living people
1983 births
Association football fullbacks